The Bahraini Premier League, also known as the Zain Basketball League, is a professional basketball league in Bahrain. The league consists of 13 teams. 

Manama Club is the most decorated team in league history, having won 21 titles including for five consecutive seasons, from 2012-13 to 2017-18. Al-Ahli ranks second with 20 national championships.

Current teams
Al-Ahli
Al-Bahrain
Al-Hala
Al-Hidd
Al-Ittihad
Manama
Al-Muharraq
Al-Najma
Al-Riffa
Al-Nweidrat
Isa Town
Samaheej
Sitra Club

Champions
2021/2022  Manama
2020/2021      Al-Ahli
2019/2020      Al-Ahli
2018/2019      Al-Muharraq
2017/2018      Manama
2016/2017	Manama
2015/2016	Manama
2013/2014	Manama
2012/2013	Manama
2011/2012	Al-Muharraq	
2010/2011	Al-Hala	
2009/2010	Al-Ahli	
2008/2009	Al-Ahli	
2007/2008	Al-Muharraq	
2006/2007	Al-Ahli	
2005/2006	Manama
2004/2005	Manama
2003/2004	Manama
2002/2003	Manama
2001/2002	Manama
2000/2001	Manama
1999/2000	Manama
1998/1999	Manama
1997/1998	Manama
1996/1997	Manama
1995/1996	Al-Hala	
1994/1995	Manama
1993/1994	Al-Hala	
1992/1993	Manama
1991/1992	Manama
1990/1991	Manama
1989/1990	Manama
1988/1989	Al-Ahli	
1987/1988	Al-Ahli	
1986/1987	Al-Ahli	
1985/1986	Al-Ahli	
1984/1985	Al-Ahli	
1983/1984	Al-Ahli	
1982/1983	Al-Ahli	
1981/1982	Al-Ahli	
1980/1981	Al-Ahli	
1979/1980	Al-Ahli	
1978/1979	Al-Ahli	
1977/1978	Manama
1976/1977	Al-Ahli	
1975/1976	Al-Ahli	
1974/1975	Al-Ahli

Performance by club 
Four teams have won the Bahraini Premier League thus far, as Manama Club (21), Al-Ahli (20), Al-Hala (3) and Al-Muharraq (3) have won every title since the league's inception in 1974.

References

External links
 Bahrain Premier League
 Bahrain basketball

Basketball leagues in Asia
Basketball in Bahrain